Señor Blues may refer to:

"Señor Blues" (song), a composition by Horace Silver
Señor Blues (Taj Mahal album)
Señor Blues (Urbie Green album)